Green Action is an environmental organisation based in Zagreb, Croatia and the national member of Friends of the Earth. Based with a full-time activist group with thirteen members back by a larger number of volunteers, the organisation works on topics related to biodiversity, energy, climate change, freshwater, genetically modified organisms, transport, urbanism and waste. Green Action was founded in 1990.

Green Action is part of the 30 national organisations that Friends of the Earth Europe represents and unites at the European level.

See also 
 Tomislav Tomašević

References

External links 
 
 Friends of the Earth Europe

Environmental organizations based in Croatia
Friends of the Earth
Organizations based in Zagreb
Environmental organizations established in 1990
1990 establishments in Croatia